Bradwell Abbey or Bradwell Priory is a Scheduled Monument, urban studies site, district and former civil parish in Milton Keynes, Buckinghamshire, England. The site was once the location of a Benedictine priory, founded in 1155.

Historic Bradwell Priory
The Priory was established around 1154. It grew during the Middle Ages to become an important local centre, but declined during the Black Death when, amongst others, its prior William of Loughton died. The Priory was closed in 1524 (some 12 years before the general dissolution of the monasteries) and the site of the monastery and its scanty revenues were granted to Cardinal Wolsey for the endowment of his new college. All that remains today is a small chapel and a farmhouse that has become a centre for cultural activities and an Urban Studies centre.  Many of the medieval trackways converging on the abbey became rights of way and bridleways and subsequently became part of the Milton Keynes redway system (a network of shared paths).

The arrival of the West Coast Main Line railway split the Abbey lands, with Bradwell village to the east of the line and the Abbey to the west. Today, the small Bradwell Abbey district includes parkland and industry outside the Abbey grounds.

The Abbey site in total is a Scheduled Monument.  The Chapel of St Mary is a Grade I listed building. There are a further five Grade II listed buildings or structures on the Abbey grounds.

Bradwell Abbey today

Today, Bradwell Abbey is an Urban Studies Centre, providing a workspace, library and guidance for visiting international town planners and students who wish to study Milton Keynes. It also hosts school visits to see its medieval buildings – the chapel is Grade I listed – its fish ponds and its physic garden, and how they have changed since then. Finally it provides meeting space to local community groups.

Togfest

An annual music festival was started on the site in 1999. Performers have included Vikki Clayton in 1999, Joe Driscoll in 2005. In 2009 the festival dates were 26 and 27 June and acts performing included The Swanvesta Social Club.

Bradwell Abbey district
The modern Bradwell Abbey district is a relatively small one, sandwiched as it is between the West Coast Main Line to the east, the A5 to the west, H3 Monks Way (A422) to the north and H4 Dansteed Way to the south. It includes a small industrial estate and the Loughton Valley flood plain "linear park". The Swan's Way long distance path and the Sustrans route 51 follow the valley.

Formally, it is in the Bradwell grid-square, but this square is split into three parts by the railway line (on an embankment) and the A5 (in a cutting).

Civil Parish

Bradwell Abbey formerly gave its name to a civil parish on the other side of the A5. This parish has been renamed as  Abbey Hill. Today, the abbey district itself is part of Bradwell civil parish.

See also
New Bradwell
Bradwell village
History of Milton Keynes
 Snelshall Priory
 Fishermead, a district that contains a BT telephone exchange called "Bradwell Abbey"

References

External links

"The architectural secrets of Milton Keynes" – BBC (with audio content)
Places to go: Bradwell Abbey and City Discovery Centre
The history of Bradwell Abbey – City Discovery Centre
Milton Keynes City Discovery Centre (Urban Studies educational centre).
Togfest Music Festival
'Parishes : Bradwell' – Victoria History of the Counties of England, A History of the County of Buckingham: Volume 4 (1927), pp. 283–288. (includes Bradwell Abbey and a history of its parish).
A short video tour of the Abbey today and a virtual tour of the Abbey in its heyday Milton Keynes City Discovery Centre

Areas of Milton Keynes
Former civil parishes in Buckinghamshire
Monasteries in Buckinghamshire
Scheduled monuments in Buckinghamshire
1150s establishments in England
1524 disestablishments in England
Christian monasteries established in the 12th century
Buildings and structures in Milton Keynes